The 221st Cavalry Regiment, Nevada Army National Guard, is a parent regiment under the U.S. Army Regimental System, with headquarters in Las Vegas, Nevada. It currently consists of 1st Squadron, 221st Cavalry Regiment a 600-soldier Armored Reconnaissance Squadron of the Nevada Army National Guard located in southern Nevada. For command and control purposes within the Nevada Army National Guard, 1st Squadron, 221st Cavalry Regiment, is a subordinate unit to the Land Component Commander (LCC) of the Nevada Army National Guard. In 2016, the squadron  entered into an alignment-for-training relationship with the 116th Cavalry Brigade Combat Team, 34th Infantry Division. In May 2016, the squadron donned the Shoulder Sleeve Insignia of the 116th Cavalry Brigade Combat Team. As an armored reconnaissance squadron, the 1st Squadron, 221st Cavalry Regiment, is able to deploy three mechanized cavalry troops, one armor company, a support company, a headquarters troop, and a squadron headquarters in order to accomplish its federal, state, and community missions.

Introduction

Current Units

Mission, Training, and Capabilities 
In support of their federal mission, soldiers of the squadron train as members of M2A3 Bradley infantry fighting vehicle crews, as reconnaissance platoons, and M1A1 Abrams main battle tank crews. Additionally, the squadron has a 120-mm M120 heavy mortar platoon, a fire support platoon, a medical platoon, a signal section, a sniper squad, and a unit ministry team.

When training in a traditional National Guard status, the squadron will typically complete Bradley Fighting Vehicle gunnery tables, or dismounted reconnaissance training, and tank gunnery tables, lanes. The squadron has also conducted successful training cycles providing training and validation to prepare other Nevada Army National Guard units for deployment to the middle east. Additionally, the squadron incorporates elements of stability operations, support operations, and counterinsurgency operations into larger training events.

World War II 
The 2nd Battalion, 115th Engineers, an element of the 40th Division was constituted on November 3, 1928 in the Nevada National Guard and federally recognized on May 1, 1936 with Headquarters in Reno. By January 1, 1941, the unit was converted and re-designated as the 121st Separate Coast Artillery Battalion and relieved from assignment to the 40th Division. Upon the US entry into World War II, the battalion was ordered into Federal Service and on June 25, 1942 the battalion would drop the "Separate" moniker as a federal unit. It would not be until September 10 of 1943 that the 121st was reorganized into a Antiaircraft Artillery Gun Battalion and deploy in the Pacific Theatre. As continual improvements in technology progressed through the war, the unit would be reorganized as the 1st Rocket Battalion on January 4, 1945 and re-designated as the 421st Rocket Field Artillery Battalion on April 13 of that year while participating in the Ryukyus Campaign. Upon the end of the war, the 421st would be deactivated on January 15, 1946 at Ft Lawton, Washington.

Postwar era 
As the dust settled from World War II, the units of the Nevada National Guard would begin to re-organize and become federally recognized. It was on January 23, 1948 that the 421st Antiaircraft Artillery Gun Battalion was federally recognized and headquartered in Las Vegas. Upon the conclusion of the Korean War, there was a triggering of unit change across the Army. With the changing times, the battalion would be re-organized as the 421st Antiaircraft Artillery Automatic Weapons Battalion on December 1st 1952. Throughout the 1950's manning across Nevada would fluctuate and unit needs changed. So on April 1, 1959 the 421st Antiaircraft Artillery, 422nd Antiaircraft Artillery and the 226th Antiaircraft artillery detachment would be merged into the newly formed 221st Artillery.

221st Artillery 
The 221st Artillery, a parent regiment under the Combat Arms Regimental System, was composed of 1st Gun Battalion, 2nd Gun Battalion, and 3rd Gun Detachment. This would be the first designation of the unit as the 221st.

With the increasing cold war tensions and impending conflict in Southeast Asia, the Regiment was reorganized as an Automatic weapons regiment on June 1, 1962. After the reorganization the regiment would maintain the same structure of 2 battalions and 1 detachment until November 1965 where the outbreak of the Vietnam war would see the consolidation of the regiment to 1st Automatic weapons battalion and the 3rd Detachment.

Return of the Cavalry 
With the ongoing force structure changes of the Vietnam war, the regiment would mount up in December 1967 as 3rd Squadron, 116th Armored Cavalry Regiment with Headquarters in Reno, NV. By May 1974 the unit was relocated back to Las Vegas as the 3rd Squadron 163rd Armored Cavalry Regiment.

The Armor Regiment 
With the Vietnam war over, and the Army looking to add armor force restructure, the Regiment was reorganized and renamed as the 221st Armor Regiment on April 1, 1980. The new regiment would consist of  the 1st Battalion, 221st Armor and was assigned as an element of the 40th Infantry Division. In 1989 the Combat Arms Regimental System was withdrawn and the unit was reorganized under the newly formed U.S. Army Regimental System.

The Squadron 

In 1995 the armored Battalion was realigned as a round out Squadron of the 11th ACR where they would fight along side their active duty counterparts in NTC rotations. In 2007 the Cavalry Squadron would trade in its Abrams tanks for scout variant Bradley Fighting vehicles and reorganize as a Armored Reconnaissance squadron. In 2016 the squadron would leave the 11th ACR and realign as the reconnaissance squadron for the 116th Cavalry Brigade Combat Team, a National Guard Brigade out of Boise, ID.

Global War on Terrorism to present 
In 2001 the squadron was part of the 11th Armored Cavalry Regiment. After the events of September 11th 2001, elements of the squadron would be called to active service for security missions at Nellis Air force Base, McCarran International Airport, and other key pieces of infrastructure under Operation Noble Eagle.  The entire squadron would be activated under the command of LTC Johnny H. Isaak, from June 2004 until April 2006, serving as OPFOR at Fort Irwin National Training Center while 1st Squadron, 11th ACR and 2nd Squadron, 11th ACR deployed in support of Operation Iraqi Freedom. During their activation the squadron would participate in over 15 rotations, successfully preparing over 50,000 soldiers from the US Army, US Navy Seals, Army Special forces and Marine Corps for deployment to the middle east.

Afghanistan 

In DEC 2008 the Squadron was alerted for mobilization and deployment to Afghanistan in support of Operation Enduring Freedom.  Pre mobilization training was conducted in January at Camp Roberts CA.  The squadron mobilized in April and conducted post mobilization training at Camp Atterbury Indiana.  In May 2009  the Squadron deployed to Afghanistan.  

The Squadron provided 12 Security Force Platoons (SECFOR) to the US Provincial Reconstruction Teams (PRT), while the Squadron HQ and remainder of troopers was assigned as the Coalition force responsible for Laghman Province battlespace. In this AOR the occupied FOB Mehtar Lam, with combat outposts at Xio Haq and Nagil.  

The Squadron conducted combat operations throughout Afghanistan until April 2010, when it redeployed and demobilized.   Ultimately 752 Wildhorse troopers deployed, with 48 earning the Purple Heart for combat wounds. No troopers were lost.

Expeditionary 
In November 2021, the Squadron's tank company, Delta "Die Hard" was activated in support of Operation Enduring Freedom (Spartan Shield) based out of Kuwait.

Civil Support Missions 
Throughout its history, the squadron has been often called on to support local civil authorities in everything from New Years Eve events on the Las Vegas Strip, to pandemic response, and more.

COVID-19 
In May 2020, Soldiers from the squadron were mobilized as part of the state's COVID-19 response. These Soldiers supported local hospitals, food banks, homeless shelters and eventually vaccination sites as part of the Nevada COVID response Joint Task Force.

2021 Presidential Inauguration 
In the wake of the January 6th United States Capitol attack, the squadron would be activated to service for Operation Capitol Response in support of the 59th Presidential Inauguration in Washington D.C.

Unit Awards & Decorations 
The Squadron's awards include the prestigious Goodrich Riding Trophy, the Governor’s Outstanding Unit Award, “Top Gunnery Battalion” of the 40th Infantry Division (Mechanized), National Guard Bureau Superior Unit Award, the Eisenhower Trophy, and the Meritorious Unit Commendation for service in Afghanistan.

References 

Cavalry regiments